is a manga series written and drawn by Sanpei Shirato. Set in feudal Japan, it tells the story of a low-born ninja who has fled his clan. The series combines historical adventure with social commentary and themes of oppression and rebellion that reflect Shirato's Marxist convictions.

Plot
Kamui is a ninja from the Edo period who has decided to leave his clan. After doing so he is pursued relentlessly by the members of his former clan; who consider him to be a traitor and therefore wish to kill him. Kamui then wanders around Japan to escape from them by using his intelligence and great abilities to survive. In the course of the series Kamui begins to suffer from paranoia because of his status as a persecuted man. Kamui then started to believe that everybody wished to murder him and became distrusting of everyone he came across.

Publication
The original series, ran from December 1964 to July 1971 in the monthly gekiga magazine Garo. Two spin-offs series titled  ran in 
Weekly Shōnen Sunday from 1965 to 1967 and in Big Comic from 1982 to 1987, respectively. A continuation of Kamui Den, illustrated by Tetsuji Okamoto, ran from May 5, 1988 to April 10, 2000 in Big Comic.

In 1987, two volumes of the second Kamui Gaiden series became one of the first manga titles to be published in the United States (by Eclipse Comics and Viz Comics), as The Legend of Kamui. The Viz edition featured lettering and retouching by Usagi Yojimbo creator Stan Sakai.

Adaptations 

The manga was adapted into an anime series The Chronicles of Kamui the Ninja (1969) and a live-action film Kamui Gaiden (2009) (based on the first and second Kamui Gaiden series, respectively).

 was produced by TCJ and Zuiyo in 1969. It was broadcast in Japan from 6 April 1969 to 28 September 1969 by Fuji TV. Kamui the Ninja had 26 episodes with a running time of 22 minutes each one. An episode of the series was dubbed to English released as a VHS bundle by REMCO under their Secret of the Ninja toyline.

References

External links 
 

1964 manga
1969 anime television series debuts
Action anime and manga
Fuji TV original programming
Historical anime and manga
Manga adapted into films
Ninja in anime and manga
Seinen manga
Shōnen manga
Shogakukan franchises
Shogakukan manga
Viz Media manga
Gekiga